Albert Green (28 January 1874 – 1913) was an Australian rules footballer who played with Norwood in the SAFA and first-class cricketer who played for South Australia.

Early life
Born in Medindee, New South Wales, Green was raised in Adelaide and educated at Geelong Grammar School.

Playing career
He played 13 Victorian Football Association (VFA) matches for the Geelong Football Club in 1892 before returning to South Australia the following year where he joined Norwood. Playing mainly as a rover, Green was a member of Norwood's 1894 premiership side. In 1898 Green became the inaugural winner of the Magarey Medal. When players became tied to local clubs by residence, he retired from the game in preference to changing clubs or moving house.

He also played seven first-class cricket matches for South Australia between 1894–95 and 1898–99.

References

External links

 

1874 births
1913 deaths
Norwood Football Club players
Magarey Medal winners
Australian cricketers
South Australia cricketers
Australian rules footballers from South Australia
Australian rules footballers from Victoria (Australia)
Cricketers from New South Wales
People educated at Geelong Grammar School
Date of death missing